Arthur Ellison (born October 25, 1943) is a New Hampshire politician.

Education
Ellison earned a B.A. from Earlham College in 1965, an M.A.T. from Northwestern University, in 1966 and a Masters in Education from University of Massachusetts at Amherst in 1978.

Political career
On November 6, 2018, Ellison was elected to the New Hampshire House of Representatives where he represents the Merrimack 27 district. Ellison assumed office on December 5, 2018. Ellison is a Democrat. Ellison endorsed Bernie Sanders in the 2020 Democratic Party presidential primaries.

Personal life
Ellison resides in Concord, New Hampshire. Ellison  is married and has two children.

References

Living people
Earlham College alumni
Northwestern University alumni
University of Massachusetts Amherst College of Education alumni
Politicians from Concord, New Hampshire
Democratic Party members of the New Hampshire House of Representatives
21st-century American politicians
1943 births